Bourges station (French: Gare de Bourges) is a railway station serving the town Bourges, Cher department, central France.

Services

The station is served by Intercités (long distance) services operated by SNCF between Nantes and Lyon, and by regional services (TER Centre-Val de Loire) to Nevers, Vierzon and Montluçon.

References

Railway stations in Cher
TER Centre-Val de Loire
Railway stations in France opened in 1847
Bourges